Indian Institute of Information Technology, Design and Manufacturing, Jabalpur (IIITDM Jabalpur), also known as Pandit Dwarka Prasad Mishra Indian Institute of Information Technology, Design and Manufacturing, is an Indian Institute of Information Technology in Jabalpur, Madhya Pradesh, India that focuses on Information Technology enabled Design and Manufacturing.  It was declared to be Institute of National Importance by Government of India under IIIT Act.

Campus
The institute started functioning from the Jabalpur Engineering College's campus in 2005 until its permanent campus was constructed.

Construction of the Core lab Complex and Hostels started thereafter and was completed in June 2009.

The campus also includes three hostels. Two of them (Hall-3 and Hall-4) have triple seated rooms and one (Hall of Residence-1) is single seated. Several Hall of Residences are still under construction.

The institute also has its own cricket, football, volleyball, basketball ground, badminton court and tennis court.

Academics

Admissions
Undergraduate Students are admitted to these courses on the basis of the All India Rank in the Joint Entrance Examination (Main) (JEE MAIN) and the UCEED. The JEE results are used for admitting students into the BTech program for computer science engineering, electronics and communications engineering, mechanical engineering and smart manufacturing. UCEED results are used to admit students into the B.Des program.
For admissions to PG level courses, the GATE (for MTech programs)/CEED (Common Entrance Examination for Design) scores of candidates are considered along with the CPI (or Equivalent Grading System, e.g. CGPA) maintained throughout the Graduate course undertaken by the student.

Counseling service
The counseling Service provides logistics in improving student's difficulties in various ways from academic to social life. It is an integral part of the Institute that closely works with the faculty members and the administration along with the student community.

Rankings

Indian Institute of Information Technology, Design and Manufacturing, Jabalpur was ranked 82 among engineering colleges in India by the National Institutional Ranking Framework (NIRF) in 2022.

Research
The institute also focuses on proficient R&D skills through the efficient use of technology. The institute carries out active research in the fields of Innovative Design and Manufacturing (Embedded System Design, Design of Control Systems, VLSI, CAD/CAM, Design of Smart Structures, MEMS, Intelligent Product Design, Design of Energy Systems); Graphics, Vision and Image Processing (Computer Graphics, Image Processing, Geometric Modelling, Computer Vision, Pattern Recognition, Biometrics, Simulation, Computer Animation); Advanced Manufacturing (Rapid Prototyping, Micro-Nano Fabrication, Manufacturing Culture); Data and Knowledge Engineering (Computational Linguistics, Data Engineering, Data Engineering, Natural Language Processing, Artificial Intelligence, Parallel Algorithms, Human-Computer Interaction, Software Engineering), Wireless Networks (Wireless Sensor Networks, Vehicular Ad hoc Networks, and IoT), and Biomedical Signal Processing. The Institute carries out research in the form of thesis pursued by its postgraduate students in these areas along with sponsored projects by organisations like the Indian Ordnance Factories carried out by faculty members in some of these areas.

Student life

Fests
The students have been organizing annual festivals Tarang (Cultural Festival), Abhikalpan (Science & Technology festival) and Gusto (Sports festival) in the campus regularly ever since the inception of the institute.

References

External links
 

Education in Jabalpur
Jabalpur
Design schools in India
2005 establishments in Madhya Pradesh
Educational institutions established in 2005